The Shattered Mask is a fantasy novel by Richard Lee Byers, set in the world of the Forgotten Realms, and based on the Dungeons & Dragons role-playing game. It was published in paperback in June 2001, with a paperback reissue in July 2007.

Plot summary
The Shattered Mask is a novel in which the matriarch of a Sembian family swears revenge for a murder in her family, while a power-hungry wizard uses his ability to alter reality for murder and destruction.

Reception
In a positive review, critic Don D'Ammassa wrote, "Unlike many of the books set in this universe, this new one takes great pains to develop the characters".

References

2001 American novels
Forgotten Realms novels